Malgré-nous (or more figuratively 'we who are forced against our will') is a term that refers to men from Alsace–Lorraine who were conscripted into the German military after the region's annexation from France during World War II. The female term  is sometimes used to refer to the Alsace-Moselle women also drafted against their will into the general German War effort.

History 
Based on orders from Gauleiter Robert Heinrich Wagner, the regional military governor of Alsace, of 25 August 1942, some 100,000 Alsatians and 30,000 Mosellans were drafted by force into the German armed forces. Heller and Simpson (2013) say: "Forced enrollment was organized in Alsace largely because of the disappointing number of Alsatians volunteering for the SS (at most 2,000). The fear from the high loss rates of the German Wehrmacht especially in Russia, were the most important point to stay away from any form of volunteering in German military units. Additionally, many men who refused conscription saw their "entire family...deported after they refused to serve".  Most of those were sent to the Eastern Front. A smaller number served in the Waffen-SS.

Some Malgré-nous deserted the Wehrmacht to join the French Resistance or escape to Switzerland, thereby running the risk of having their families sent to work or concentration camps by the Germans. According to historian David Kaplan, 40,000 "either avoided the draft or deserted once in uniform". This threat obliged the majority of them to remain in the German army. After the war, they were often accused of being traitors or collaborationists.  In July 1944, 1500 Malgré-nous were released from Soviet captivity and sent to Algiers, where they joined the Free French Forces.

Thirteen Malgré-nous were involved in the massacre of Oradour-sur-Glane together with one genuine volunteer from Alsace. In a trial in Bordeaux in 1953 they were sentenced to prison terms between 5–11 years, while the volunteer was sentenced to death. The trial caused major civil unrest in Alsace, as most of the Malgré-nous had, by definition, been forced to serve in the Waffen-SS; public pressure led to a re-examination of the convictions, ultimately resulting in a general amnesty by the French National Assembly on 19 February 1953.

Of the estimated 130,000 Malgré-nous, some 32,000 were killed in action and 10,500 are still missing in action (and presumed dead). Between 5,000 and 10,000 prisoners-of-war died in captivity, most of them at the Soviet camp at Tambov. The last POWs were released in 1955. Forty thousand of the Malgré-nous were invalids after the war.

See also
Poles in the Wehrmacht
1942 Luxembourgish general strike

Notes 

Foreign units of Nazi Germany
Military history of France during World War II
German occupation of France during World War II